Acacia nivea is a shrub of the genus Acacia and the subgenus Plurinerves that is endemic to south western Australia.

Description
Like most species of Acacia it has phyllodes rather than true leaves. It blooms from July to September and produces yellow flowers. The simple inflorescences are found in pairs located in the axils and have spherical flower-heads with a diameter of  containing 9 to 12 golden coloured flowers. The thinly leathery to chartaceous seed pods that form after flowering have a linear to slightly curved shape and are raised over each of the seeds on alternate sides.

Taxonomy
It belongs to the Acacia dielsii group.

Distribution
It is native to an area in the southern Wheatbelt and Goldfields-Esperance regions of Western Australia where it is commonly situated on undulating plains growing in clay-sand or sandy-loam or sandy soils. It has a scattered and discontinuous distribution from around Lake King in the north west to around Munglinup in the south west with populations extending out to Grass Patch and the Mount Andrew and Ponier Rock in the east usually as a part of low open shrubland or tall mallee shrubland and low open woodland communities.

See also
List of Acacia species

References

nivea
Acacias of Western Australia
Taxa named by Bruce Maslin
Plants described in 1995